Sodan may refer to:
 Sodan, California
 Mythology of Stargate#Jaffa